Belle Grove Wildlife Management Area is a Wildlife Management Area in Allegany County, Maryland.

External links
 Belle Grove Wildlife Management Area

Wildlife management areas of Maryland
Protected areas of Allegany County, Maryland